Mount Swadener is a peak located in Edward VII Land, West Antarctica. This mountain is located in the Sneddon Nunataks, a group of coastal nunataks on the north side of the Alexandra Mountains of Edward VII Peninsula. Nearby geographic features include Swinburne Ice Shelf and Sulzberger Bay.

Discovery and naming

Mount Swadener was mapped by the United States Geological Survey (USGS) from ground surveys and aerial photographs taken by the United States Navy between 1959–66. It was named by the Advisory Committee on Antarctic Names (US-ACAN) for Lieutenant John R. Swadener, U.S. Navy, navigator of the ski-equipped R4D Skytrain in which Rear Admiral George J. Dufek made the first aircraft landing at the geographic South Pole on 31 October 1956.

References

Mountains of King Edward VII Land